Kazatkom (Qazatkom) is a village in Almaty Region, in south-eastern Kazakhstan. Numerous clashes between Kazakhs and ethnic Chechens have broken out in the village, notably in March–April 2007.

References

Populated places in Almaty Region